is a castle located in Minamishimabara, Nagasaki Prefecture, Japan. The castle was originally built in the 13th century. It belonged to the Arima clan, and was the residence of the Christian daimyō. In 1637, during the Shimabara Rebellion, it was burned down by the forces of the Tokugawa Shogunate. The castle's ruins can still be seen.

Sources
Nagasaki Prefectural Government: "Site of Hinoe Castle"
"Isahaya at Your Fingertips" (see "Sites of Hara Castle and Hinoe Castle")

References

Castles in Nagasaki Prefecture